Orfeon or Orfeón (Spanish "choir") may refer to:

Choirs
 Orfeon Académico de Coimbra, a Portuguese choir group
 Orfeon Chamber Choir, a Turkish choir group
 Orfeón Donostiarra, a Spanish Basque choir

Record labels
 Orfeón (Mexican record label)
 Orfeon Records, a Turkish record label